The 2005–06 Cleveland Cavaliers season was the 36th season of NBA basketball in Cleveland, Ohio. The Cavaliers finished the season with a 50–32 record, and a second-place finish in the Central Division, returning to the playoffs for the first time since 1998. In the playoffs, the Cavaliers defeated the Washington Wizards in six games in the first round and reached the semi-finals of the Eastern Conference where they lost in seven games to the Detroit Pistons. LeBron James was the team's leading scorer and was named to the All-NBA first team. He was also selected to play in the 2006 NBA All-Star Game where he won his first All-Star MVP.

For this season, they added new dark blue road alternate uniforms added side panels to their jerseys and shorts, they remained in use until 2010.

Offseason

Free agents

Trades

Draft picks

Cleveland did not have a draft pick in the 2005 NBA Draft due to trades from previous seasons.
 1st round pick (#13) traded to Phoenix in Wesley Person deal, sent to Charlotte as part of expansion selection. Used to draft Sean May.
 2nd round pick (#44) traded to Orlando in Drew Gooden deal. Used to draft Martynas Andriuskevicius who was traded back to Cleveland.

Roster

Regular season

Season standings

Record vs. opponents

Game log

|- style="background:#cfc;"
| 1 || November 2, 2005 || New Orleans/Oklahoma City
| 
| LeBron James (31)
| Donyell Marshall (9)
| Larry Hughes (6)
| Gund Arena20,562
| 1–0
|- style="background:#fcc;"
| 2 || November 4, 2005 || @ San Antonio
| 
| LeBron James (20)
| Donyell Marshall (10)
| LeBron James (4)
| SBC Center18,797
| 1–1
|- style="background:#fcc;"
| 3 || November 5, 2005 || @ Memphis
| 
| LeBron James (36)
| Zydrunas Ilgauskas (11)
| LeBron James (6)
| FedEx Forum17,368
| 1–2
|- style="background:#cfc;"
| 4 || November 7, 2005 || @ Toronto
| 
| LeBron James (27)
| Donyell Marshall (11)
| LeBron James (6)
| Air Canada Centre18,281
| 2–2
|- style="background:#cfc;"
| 5 || November 9, 2005 || Seattle
| 
| LeBron James (31)
| Donyell Marshall, Drew Gooden, Zydrunas Ilgauskas, Alan Henderson (9)
| Larry Hughes (5)
| Gund Arena19,564
| 3–2
|- style="background:#cfc;"
| 6 || November 11, 2005 || Memphis
| 
| LeBron James (16)
| Zydrunas Ilgauskas (12)
| Larry Hughes, Eric Snow (5)
| Gund Arena16,554
| 4–2
|- style="background:#cfc;"
| 7 || November 13, 2005 || @ Orlando
| 
| LeBron James (26)
| Larry Hughes (9)
| Larry Hughes (7)
| TD Waterhouse Centre15,414
| 5–2
|- style="background:#cfc;"
| 8 || November 15, 2005 || Washington
| 
| LeBron James (37)
| LeBron James (10)
| Larry Hughes (8)
| Gund Arena17,685
| 6–2
|- style="background:#cfc;"
| 9 || November 18, 2005 || Orlando
| 
| Zydrunas Ilgauskas (22)
| Zydrunas Ilgauskas (11)
| Larry Hughes (6)
| Gund Arena18,591
| 7–2
|- style="background:#cfc;"
| 10 || November 19, 2005 || @ Philadelphia
| 
| Larry Hughes (37)
| Drew Gooden (13)
| LeBron James (10)
| Wachovia Center18,908
| 8–2
|- style="background:#cfc;"
| 11 || November 22, 2005 || Boston
| 
| LeBron James (36)
| Drew Gooden (15)
| Eric Snow (9)
| Gund Arena17,139
| 9–2
|- style="background:#fcc;"
| 12 || November 24, 2005 || @ Indiana
| 
| LeBron James (19)
| LeBron James (10)
| LeBron James (4)
| Conseco Fieldhouse17,243
| 9–3
|- style="background:#fcc;"
| 13 || November 26, 2005 || Minnesota
| 
| LeBron James (38)
| Drew Gooden (12)
| Eric Snow (3)
| Gund Arena20,562
| 9–4
|- style="background:#cfc;"
| 14 || November 30, 2005 || L.A. Clippers
| 
| Zydrunas Ilgauskas (29)
| Zydrunas Ilgauskas (10)
| LeBron James (9)
| Gund Arena18,209
| 10–4

|- style="background:#fcc;"
| 15 || December 2, 2005 || @ Seattle
| 
| LeBron James (34)
| Drew Gooden (7)
| LeBron James (8)
| KeyArena17,072
| 10–5
|- style="background:#fcc;"
| 16 || December 3, 2005 || @ L.A. Clippers
| 
| LeBron James (30)
| Drew Gooden (12)
| LeBron James (6)
| STAPLES Center18,369
| 10–6
|- style="background:#cfc;"
| 17 || December 6, 2005 || @ Sacramento
| 
| LeBron James (30)
| Drew Gooden, Zydrunas Ilgauskas (7)
| LeBron James, Larry Hughes (6)
| ARCO Arena17,317
| 11–6
|- style="background:#fcc;"
| 18 || December 9, 2005 || New Jersey
| 
| LeBron James (32)
| Donyell Marshall (10)
| Eric Snow (5)
| Gund Arena18,177
| 11–7
|- style="background:#fcc;"
| 19 || December 10, 2005 || @ Milwaukee
| 
| LeBron James (52)
| LeBron James, Donyell Marshall (7)
| LeBron James (7)
| Bradley Center18,717
| 11–8
|- style="background:#fcc;"
| 20 || December 13, 2005 || Atlanta
| 
| LeBron James (39)
| Drew Gooden (11)
| LeBron James, Eric Snow (6)
| Gund Arena17,114
| 11–9
|- style="background:#cfc;"
| 21 || December 15, 2005 || Denver
| 
| LeBron James (26)
| Donyell Marshall (12)
| LeBron James (9)
| Gund Arena17,182
| 12–9
|- style="background:#cfc;"
| 22 || December 17, 2005 || Miami
| 
| LeBron James (41)
| Donyell Marshall (13)
| LeBron James (10)
| Gund Arena20,562
| 13–9
|- style="background:#cfc;"
| 23 || December 20, 2005 || Utah
| 
| LeBron James (25)
| Zydrunas Ilgauskas (7)
| Eric Snow (6)
| Gund Arena19,543
| 14–9
|- style="background:#cfc;"
| 24 || December 22, 2005 || @ Chicago
| 
| LeBron James (37)
| Zydrunas Ilgauskas (11)
| LeBron James (6)
| United Center21,874
| 15–9
|- style="background:#cfc;"
| 25 || December 23, 2005 || Indiana
| 
| Drew Gooden (21)
| Drew Gooden (12)
| LeBron James (9)
| Gund Arena18,757
| 16–9
|- style="background:#cfc;"
| 26 || December 26, 2005 || Chicago
| 
| LeBron James (32)
| Zydrunas Ilgauskas (14)
| LeBron James, Eric Snow (6)
| Gund Arena20,562
| 17–9
|- style="background:#fcc;"
| 27 || December 27, 2005 || @ New Jersey
| 
| LeBron James (31)
| Donyell Marshall (14)
| LeBron James (8)
| Continental Airlines Arena20,098
| 17–10
|- style="background:#cfc;"
| 28 || December 31, 2005 || Detroit
| 
| LeBron James (30)
| Drew Gooden (13)
| LeBron James (7)
| Gund Arena20,562
| 18–10

|- style="background:#cfc;"
| 29 || January 4, 2006 || @ Milwaukee
| 
| LeBron James (32)
| LeBron James (11)
| LeBron James (11)
| Bradley Center15,785
| 19–10
|- style="background:#fcc;"
| 30 || January 5, 2006 || Houston
| 
| LeBron James (32)
| Zydrunas Ilgauskas (10)
| LeBron James, Eric Snow (5)
| Gund Arena18,019
| 19–11
|- style="background:#cfc;"
| 31 || January 7, 2006 || Milwaukee
| 
| LeBron James (35)
| Drew Gooden (17)
| LeBron James (6)
| Gund Arena19,840
| 20–11
|- style="background:#fcc;"
| 32 || January 10, 2006 || New York
| 
| LeBron James (36)
| Drew Gooden (12)
| LeBron James (7)
| Gund Arena18,064
| 20–12
|- style="background:#fcc;"
| 33 || January 12, 2006 || @ L.A. Lakers
| 
| Zydrunas Ilgauskas (29)
| Drew Gooden (11)
| LeBron James (9)
| STAPLES Center18,997
| 20–13
|- style="background:#fcc;"
| 34 || January 14, 2006 || @ Phoenix
| 
| LeBron James (46)
| Zydrunas Ilgauskas (12)
| LeBron James (8)
| America West Arena18,422
| 20–14
|- style="background:#fcc;"
| 35 || January 15, 2006 || @ Portland
| 
| LeBron James (29)
| LeBron James (13)
| LeBron James (7)
| Rose Garden Arena19,383
| 20–15
|- style="background:#fcc;"
| 36 || January 18, 2006 || @ Denver
| 
| LeBron James (24)
| Alan Henderson (12)
| LeBron James (9)
| Pepsi Center19,009
| 20–16
|- style="background:#fcc;"
| 37 || January 20, 2006 || @ Golden State
| 
| Drew Gooden (16)
| Zydrunas Ilgauskas (11)
| LeBron James (6)
| Oakland Arena20,205
| 20–17
|- style="background:#cfc;"
| 38 || January 21, 2006 || @ Utah
| 
| LeBron James (51)
| Zydrunas Ilgauskas (8)
| LeBron James (8)
| Delta Center19,340
| 21–17
|- style="background:#cfc;"
| 39 || January 24, 2006 || Indiana
| 
| LeBron James (23)
| Drew Gooden (10)
| LeBron James (8)
| Gund Arena19,069
| 22–17
|- style="background:#cfc;"
| 40 || January 25, 2006 || @ Atlanta
| 
| LeBron James (38)
| Drew Gooden (14)
| Eric Snow (8)
| Philips Arena16,089
| 23–17
|- style="background:#cfc;"
| 41 || January 27, 2006 || @ Indiana
| 
| LeBron James (30)
| LeBron James (7)
| LeBron James (9)
| Conseco Fieldhouse18,345
| 24–17
|- style="background:#cfc;"
| 42 || January 29, 2006 || Phoenix
| 
| LeBron James (44)
| LeBron James (11)
| LeBron James (7)
| Gund Arena20,562
| 25–17
|- style="background:#cfc;"
| 43 || January 30, 2006 || @ Charlotte
| 
| LeBron James (30)
| Drew Gooden (12)
| Eric Snow (7)
| Charlotte Bobcats Arena17,142
| 26–17

|- style="background:#cfc;"
| 44 || February 1, 2006 || New Jersey
| 
| LeBron James (26)
| LeBron James (11)
| LeBron James (10)
| Gund Arena19,460
| 27–17
|- style="background:#fcc;"
| 45 || February 2, 2006 || @ Miami
| 
| LeBron James (29)
| Zydrunas Ilgauskas, Drew Gooden (8)
| LeBron James (7)
| AmericanAirlines Arena20,168
| 27–18
|- style="background:#fcc;"
| 46 || February 4, 2006 || Philadelphia
| 
| LeBron James (31)
| Zydrunas Ilgauskas (11)
| LeBron James (6)
| Gund Arena20,562
| 27–19
|- style="background:#cfc;"
| 47 || February 6, 2006 || Milwaukee
| 
| LeBron James (22)
| LeBron James (9)
| LeBron James (12)
| Gund Arena19,126
| 28–19
|- style="background:#cfc;"
| 48 || February 8, 2006 || @ Minnesota
| 
| LeBron James (35)
| Donyell Marshall (13)
| LeBron James (8)
| Target Center17,093
| 29–19
|- style="background:#fcc;"
| 49 || February 10, 2006 || @ Washington
| 
| LeBron James (18)
| LeBron James, Drew Gooden (9)
| LeBron James (8)
| MCI Center20,173
| 29–20
|- style="background:#fcc;"
| 50 || February 11, 2006 || Golden State
| 
| LeBron James (33)
| Zydrunas Ilgauskas (8)
| Damon Jones (7)
| Gund Arena20,562
| 29–21
|- style="background:#cfc;"
| 51 || February 13, 2006 || San Antonio
| 
| LeBron James (44)
| Zydrunas Ilgauskas (11)
| Eric Snow (6)
| Gund Arena19,486
| 30–21
|- style="background:#cfc;"
| 52 || February 15, 2006 || @ Boston
| 
| LeBron James (43)
| LeBron James (12)
| LeBron James (11)
| TD Garden17,915
| 31–21
|- style="background:#cfc;"
| 53 || February 21, 2006 || Orlando
| 
| LeBron James (26)
| Zydrunas Ilgauskas (13)
| LeBron James (9)
| Gund Arena20,562
| 32–21
|- style="background:#fcc;"
| 54 || February 22, 2006 || @ Philadelphia
| 
| LeBron James (33)
| Zydrunas Ilgauskas, Drew Gooden (9)
| Eric Snow (8)
| Wachovia Center20,196
| 32–22
|- style="background:#fcc;"
| 55 || February 24, 2006 || Washington
| 
| LeBron James (25)
| Zydrunas Ilgauskas (9)
| LeBron James (9)
| Gund Arena20,562
| 32–23
|- style="background:#fcc;"
| 56 || February 26, 2006 || @ Detroit
| 
| LeBron James (22)
| LeBron James, Zydrunas Ilgauskas (9)
| LeBron James (7)
| The Palace of Auburn Hills22,076
| 32–24
|- style="background:#fcc;"
| 57 || February 27, 2006 || Detroit
| 
| LeBron James (26)
| Zydrunas Ilgauskas (15)
| LeBron James (6)
| Gund Arena19,286
| 32–25

|- style="background:#fcc;"
| 58 || March 1, 2006 || Sacramento
| 
| LeBron James, Ronald Murray, Zydrunas Ilgauskas (19)
| LeBron James (7)
| LeBron James (12)
| Gund Arena17,363
| 32–26
|- style="background:#cfc;"
| 59 || March 2, 2006 || @ Chicago
| 
| LeBron James (33)
| LeBron James (11)
| LeBron James, Eric Snow (8)
| United Center20,726
| 33–26
|- style="background:#cfc;"
| 60 || March 5, 2006 || Chicago
| 
| LeBron James (37)
| Anderson Varejão (13)
| LeBron James, Eric Snow (7)
| Gund Arena20,562
| 34–26
|- style="background:#cfc;"
| 61 || March 7, 2006 || Toronto
| 
| Ronald Murray (24)
| LeBron James (12)
| Eric Snow (11)
| Gund Arena18,077
| 35–26
|- style="background:#cfc;"
| 62 || March 8, 2006 || @ Toronto
| 
| LeBron James (35)
| Drew Gooden, Donyell Marshall (8)
| LeBron James, Eric Snow (6)
| Air Canada Centre19,800
| 36–26
|- style="background:#fcc;"
| 63 || March 10, 2006 || @ Orlando
| 
| LeBron James (25)
| Drew Gooden (12)
| Eric Snow (5)
| TD Waterhouse Centre17,283
| 36–27
|- style="background:#fcc;"
| 64 || March 12, 2006 || @ Miami
| 
| LeBron James (47)
| Drew Gooden (12)
| LeBron James, Eric Snow (4)
| AmericanAirlines Arena20,268
| 36–28
|- style="background:#fcc;"
| 65 || March 14, 2006 || @ Dallas
| 
| LeBron James (36)
| Zydrunas Ilgauskas (13)
| LeBron James, Eric Snow (5)
| American Airlines Center20,425
| 36–29
|- style="background:#cfc;"
| 66 || March 17, 2006 || Portland
| 
| LeBron James (27)
| Drew Gooden (14)
| LeBron James, Eric Snow (5)
| Gund Arena20,562
| 37–29
|- style="background:#cfc;"
| 67 || March 19, 2006 || L.A. Lakers
| 
| LeBron James (29)
| Drew Gooden (9)
| LeBron James (7)
| Gund Arena20,562
| 38–29
|- style="background:#cfc;"
| 68 || March 22, 2006 || Charlotte
| 
| LeBron James (37)
| LeBron James (11)
| LeBron James (12)
| Gund Arena18,550
| 39–29
|- style="background:#cfc;"
| 69 || March 24, 2006 || Boston
| 
| LeBron James (36)
| Zydrunas Ilgauskas (11)
| LeBron James (8)
| Gund Arena20,562
| 40–29
|- style="background:#cfc;"
| 70 || March 26, 2006 || @ Houston
| 
| LeBron James (36)
| Zydrunas Ilgauskas, Drew Gooden (8)
| Damon Jones (6)
| Toyota Center16,839
| 41–29
|- style="background:#cfc;"
| 71 || March 29, 2006 || Dallas
| 
| LeBron James (46)
| Zydrunas Ilgauskas (9)
| Eric Snow (5)
| Gund Arena19,401
| 42–29

|- style="background:#cfc;"
| 72 || April 1, 2006 || Miami
| 
| LeBron James (47)
| LeBron James (12)
| LeBron James (9)
| Gund Arena20,562
| 43–29
|- style="background:#cfc;"
| 73 || April 2, 2006 || @ Charlotte
| 
| LeBron James (35)
| LeBron James (12)
| LeBron James (8)
| Charlotte Bobcats Arena18,491
| 44–29
|- style="background:#cfc;"
| 74 || April 4, 2006 || Philadelphia
| 
| LeBron James (37)
| Anderson Varejão (14)
| LeBron James (7)
| Gund Arena18,581
| 45–29
|- style="background:#fcc;"
| 75 || April 5, 2006 || @ New York
| 
| LeBron James (36)
| Drew Gooden, Anderson Varejão (12)
| LeBron James (7)
| Madison Square Garden19,763
| 45–30
|- style="background:#cfc;"
| 76 || April 8, 2006 || @ New Jersey
| 
| LeBron James (37)
| Drew Gooden (9)
| LeBron James (7)
| Continental Airlines Arena19,048
| 46–30
|- style="background:#cfc;"
| 77 || April 10, 2006 || @ New Orleans/Oklahoma City
| 
| LeBron James (32)
| Anderson Varejão (8)
| LeBron James (6)
| Ford Center19,187
| 47–30
|- style="background:#fcc;"
| 78 || April 12, 2006 || @ Detroit
| 
| LeBron James (22)
| Zydrunas Ilgauskas (8)
| Damon Jones (4)
| The Palace of Auburn Hills22,076
| 47–31
|- style="background:#cfc;"
| 79 || April 13, 2006 || New York
| 
| Larry Hughes (26)
| Zydrunas Ilgauskas (14)
| Larry Hughes (6)
| Gund Arena20,562
| 48–31
|- style="background:#fcc;"
| 80 || April 16, 2006 || @ Washington
| 
| LeBron James (17)
| Anderson Varejão, Drew Gooden (9)
| LeBron James, Ronald Murray (4)
| MCI Center18,405
| 48–32
|- style="background:#cfc;"
| 81 || April 17, 2006 || @ Boston
| 
| Larry Hughes (21)
| Larry Hughes (5)
| Eric Snow (9)
| TD Garden18,624
| 49–32
|- style="background:#cfc;"
| 82 || April 19, 2006 || Atlanta
| 
| Ronald Murray (19)
| Anderson Varejão (18)
| Ronald Murray (6)
| Gund Arena20,562
| 50–32

Player stats

Regular Season

Playoffs

Playoffs 
2006 marked the first time LeBron James made the playoffs in his career, and the first time the Cavaliers had made the playoffs since 1998 with Shawn Kemp. They came off a playoff series win vs the Wizards, while the Pistons came in off a 4–1 win vs the 8th seeded Bucks. Detroit was expected to win the series, and took a commanding two games to none lead with two wins at the Palace of Auburn Hills. James and the Cavaliers would not be intimidated however, and won their two games at home to tie the series 2–2. Coming into game 5, both teams were confident, but the Pistons were expected to pull out the win easily. The game was low scoring throughout as usual in this series, with Cleveland holding a 68 to 66 lead throughout 3 quarters. With the game tied at 84 with 26 seconds left in regulation, Drew Gooden came through and hit a layup to give Cleveland the lead that they would never squander. James led the Cavs with 32 and this brought the series to Cleveland up 3–2, quite shockingly. Detroit held on to a 2-point win to win game 6, and won game 7 at home to seal the deal, but this was the coming out party for the Cavaliers in the playoffs, scaring the 2004 champs.

|- style="background:#cfc;"
| 1 || April 22 || Washington || W 97–86 || LeBron James (32) || LeBron James (11) || LeBron James (11) ||Gund Arena20,562 || 1–0
|- style="background:#fcc;"
| 2 || April 25 || Washington || L 84–89 || LeBron James (26) || Drew Gooden (16) || Eric Snow (4) ||Gund Arena20,562 || 1–1
|- style="background:#cfc;"
| 3 || April 28 || @ Washington || W 97–96 || LeBron James (41) || Ilgauskas, Gooden (8) || James, Snow (3) ||MCI Center20,173 || 2–1
|- style="background:#fcc;"
| 4 || April 30 || @ Washington || L 96–106 || LeBron James (45) || Drew Gooden (11) || LeBron James (6) ||MCI Center20,173 || 2–2
|- style="background:#cfc;"
| 5 || May 3 || Washington || W 121–120 (OT) || LeBron James (38) || Donyell Marshall (11) || LeBron James (5) ||Gund Arena20,562 || 3–2
|- style="background:#cfc;"
| 6 || May 5 || @ Washington || W 114–113 (OT) || LeBron James (32) || Anderson Varejão (10) || Larry Hughes (12) ||MCI Center20,173 || 4–2

|- style="background:#fcc;"
| 1 || May 7 || @ Detroit || L 86–113 || LeBron James (22) || Anderson Varejão (8) || James, Murray (4) ||The Palace of Auburn Hills22,076 || 0–1
|- style="background:#fcc;"
| 2 || May 9 || @ Detroit || L 91–97 || LeBron James (30) || LeBron James (14) || LeBron James (7) ||The Palace of Auburn Hills22,076 || 0–2
|- style="background:#cfc;"
| 3 || May 13 || Detroit || W 86–77 || LeBron James (21) || LeBron James (10) || LeBron James (10) ||Gund Arena20,562 || 1–2
|- style="background:#cfc;"
| 4 || May 15 || Detroit || W 74–72 || LeBron James (22) || LeBron James (8) || LeBron James (9) ||Gund Arena20,562 || 2–2
|- style="background:#cfc;"
| 5 || May 17 || @ Detroit || W 86–84 || LeBron James (32) || Donyell Marshall (13) || Eric Snow (7) ||The Palace of Auburn Hills22,076 || 3–2
|- style="background:#fcc;"
| 6 || May 19 || Detroit || L 82–84 || LeBron James (32) || LeBron James (11) || Eric Snow (6) ||Gund Arena20,562 || 3–3
|- style="background:#fcc;"
| 7 || May 21 || @ Detroit || L 61–79 || LeBron James (27) || LeBron James (8) || Larry Hughes (5) ||The Palace of Auburn Hills22,076 || 3–4

Awards and records

Awards
 LeBron James was named the Eastern Conference Player of the Week for games played from November 14 through November 20.
 LeBron James was named the Eastern Conference Player of the Week for games played from January 24 through January 30.
 LeBron James was named the Eastern Conference Player of the Week for games played from March 14 through March 20.
 LeBron James was named the Eastern Conference Player of the Week for games played from March 21 through March 27.
 LeBron James was named the Eastern Conference Player of the Week for games played from March 27 through April 2. He became the first player in NBA history to win the award three consecutive weeks.
 LeBron James was named the Eastern Conference Player of the Month for the month of November, the third time he has won the award.
 LeBron James was named the Eastern Conference Player of the Month for the month of March, the fourth time he has won the award.
 LeBron James was named to the All-NBA first team. James is the youngest first-teamer in NBA history and only the second Cavalier (Mark Price) to receive the honors.
 LeBron James finished in 2nd place in league MVP voting (Steve Nash).

Records
 On November 19, vs. the Philadelphia 76ers, Larry Hughes (37) and LeBron James (36) became the first two teammates in franchise history to score 35 points or more in the same game.
 LeBron James set the franchise single-season record for points with 2,478.
 LeBron James set other franchise records for: scoring average (31.4), field goals made (875), field goals attempted (1873), free throws made (601), and free throws attempted (841).
 LeBron James set the franchise record for points in a single postseason with 400.
 In Game 6 of the Washington Wizards First Round series, the team set a franchise record for bench points with 57.
 LeBron James set the franchise record for points in a single postseason series with 214.
 Mike Brown became the first coach in franchise history to win a playoff series in his first year.
 For the season, LeBron James led the team in scoring for a game 72 times, a franchise record.
 The Cavaliers finished the season 5–0 in overtime games, a franchise record for wins and %.

Milestones
 On November 13, LeBron James became the youngest player in NBA history to score 4,000 career points (20 years, 318 days).
 On January 21, LeBron James became the youngest player in NBA history to score 5,000 career points (21 years, 22 days).
 On March 29, LeBron James became the youngest player in NBA history to score 6,000 career points (21 years, 89 days).
 On April 13, Mike Brown won his 48th game as head coach, the most by a rookie coach in franchise history.
 For the season, LeBron James made 19/29 field goals attempts in the last two minutes of a one-possession game. He led the league in that statistic.

All-Star
 LeBron James came in third in Eastern Conference votes received and was voted in as a starter for the 2006 NBA All-Star Game for the 2nd time in his career. He became the first Cavalier in team history to start multiple All-Star games and the 7th to play in multiple games.
 LeBron James became the youngest All-Star Game MVP in NBA history with 29 points, 6 rebounds and 2 assists in the East's 122–120 win.
 LeBron James participated in the Skills Challenge and finished in 2nd place.
 LeBron James led his team in points, rebounds and assists in a game 16 times, a league-high.

Transactions

Trades

Free agents

*Waived by team mid-season and later re-signed to two 10-day contracts.
**Signed to two successive 10-day contracts and then the remainder of the season.
***Traded for and then immediately waived before playing in a game.

Development League
 On January 22, Martynas Andriuskevicius was assigned to the NBDL's Arkansas Rimrockers.
 On February 1, Martynas Andriuskevicius was recalled from the Rimrockers.
 On March 2, Martynas Andriuskevicius was reassigned to the Rimrockers.
 On March 6, Martynas Andriuskevicius was recalled from the Rimrockers.
 On March 16, Martynas Andriuskevicius was reassigned to the Rimrockers.
 On April 12, Martynas Andriuskevicius was recalled from the Rimrockers.

References

 Cleveland Cavaliers on Database Basketball
 Cleveland Cavaliers on Basketball Reference
 2005–06 Season Media Guide

Cleveland Cavaliers seasons
Cleve
Cleve